Mitch Stockentree (born 22 January 1991) is a Dutch former professional footballer who played as a right-back.

Career
Stockentree made his debut for FC Twente in a UEFA Champions League match on 10 November 2010 against Werder Bremen. He only played one more match for Twente in the KNVB Beker. After two seasons, he signed a two-year deal with FC Oss in the summer of 2012.

Honours

Club
Twente
Johan Cruijff Schaal: 2010

References

External links
 Voetbal International

Living people
1991 births
Footballers from Enschede
Dutch footballers
Association football fullbacks
FC Twente players
TOP Oss players
Eintracht Nordhorn players
Excelsior '31 players
Eerste Divisie players
Dutch expatriate footballers
Dutch expatriate sportspeople in Germany
Expatriate footballers in Germany